9th National Assembly may refer to:

 9th National Assembly of France
 9th National Assembly of Laos
 9th National Assembly of Nigeria
 9th National Assembly of Pakistan
 9th National Assembly of Serbia